41 Lyncis b (abbreviated 41 Lyn b), also designated HD 81688 b and named Arkas , is an extrasolar planet approximately 280 light-years from Earth in the constellation of Ursa Major.

A gas giant with a minimum mass 2.7 times that of Jupiter, it orbits the K-type star 41 Lyncis with an orbital period of 184 days (corresponding to a semi-major axis of 0.81 AU). It was discovered and announced by Bun'ei Sato on February 19, 2008.

Name
In July 2014, the International Astronomical Union (IAU) launched NameExoWorlds, a process for giving proper names to certain exoplanets and their host stars. The process involved public nomination and voting for the new names. In December 2015, the IAU announced the name Arkas for this planet. The winning name was submitted by the Okayama Astro Club of Japan. Arkas was the son of Callisto (Ursa Major) in Greek mythology.

See also
 18 Delphini b
 Xi Aquilae b

References

 

Ursa Major (constellation)
Giant planets
Exoplanets discovered in 2008
Exoplanets detected by radial velocity
Exoplanets with proper names